Best Scandal (stylized as BEST★SCANDAL) is the debut studio album of Japanese pop rock band Scandal. It was released in three versions with different covers: the regular CD only version, a limited version that consists of CD with DVD, and a collector's edition consist of a CD and a coffee table book (photobook). SCANDAL BY SCANDAL is a 284-page coffee table book that features photos of the band members taken by the band members themselves. The album reached no. 5 on the Oricon weekly charts and charted for 21 weeks.

Track listing

Personnel
HARUNA (Haruna Ono) - lead vocals, rhythm guitar
MAMI (Mami Sasazaki) - lead guitar, vocals
TOMOMI (Tomomi Ogawa) - bass, vocals
RINA (Rina Suzuki) - drums, vocals

Sales 

Total Reported Sales: 52,956
Total Sales in 2009: 44,995 (#197 album of the year)
Total Sales in 2010: 7,961

References

2009 debut albums
Scandal (Japanese band) albums
Epic Records albums
Japanese-language albums